Kartal Tibet (27 March 1939 – 1 July 2021) was a Turkish actor and film director. Some of his famous films include Ölmeyen Aşk, Dağlar Kızı, Senede Bir Gün, Sultan, Zübük, Gol Kralı, and Şalvar Davası. Tibet was also known for his action roles, especially that of the title series.

On 1 July 2021, he died in Istanbul, aged 82. He was laid to rest at the Zincirlikuyu Cemetery on 3 July 2021.

Filmography

As actor 

1960s

 Karaoğlan – Altay'dan gelen yiğit (1965) .... Karaoğlan (a.k.a. Karaoglan: The Hero from Altai)
 Hıçkırık (1965)
 Yiğit kanı (1966)
 Siyah gül (1966) (a.k.a. The Black Rose)
 Ölüm temizler (1966)
 Ölmeyen aşk (1966) (a.k.a. Immortal Love)
 Karaoğlan – Camoka'nın intikamı (1966) .... Karaoğlan (a.k.a. Karaoglan: Camoka's Revenge)
 Karaoğlan – Baybora'nın oğlu (1966) .... Karaoğlan (a.k.a. Karaoglan: Baybora's Son)
 Kanunsuz yol (1966)
 İnsan bir kere ölür (1966)
 Fatih'in fedaisi (1966) .... Murat
 Damgalı kadın (1966)
 Çalıkuşu (1966) .... Kamran (a.k.a. Firecrest in the UK)
 Bir millet uyanıyor (1966) .... Captain Davut (a.k.a. A Nation Is Awaking)
 Beyoğlu'nda vuruşanlar (1966)
 Ben bir sokak kadınıyım (1966) .... Ferdi (a.k.a. I Am a Whore)
 Senede bir gün (1966) .... Emin
 Son gece (1967) .... Faruk
 Sefiller (1967)
 Paşa kızı (1967) .... Selim
 Parmaklıklar arkasında (1967)
 Osmanlı kabadayısı (1967)
 Ömre bedel kız (1967)
 Ölünceye kadar (1967)
 Karaoğlan – Yeşil ejder (1967) .... Karaoğlan
 Karaoğlan – Bizanslı zorba (1967) .... Karaoğlan
 Kara Davut (1967) .... Kara Davut
 Kanunsuz toprak (1967)
 Kader bağı (1967) .... Korkusuz Bill
 Hırsız prenses (1967)
 Elveda (1967)
 Dokuzuncu hariciye koğuşu (1967) .... Burhan (a.k.a. Ninth Surgery Ward)
 Amansız takip (1967)
 Tahran macerası (1968)
 Son hatıra (1968)
 Sevemez kimse seni (1968)
 Sarmaşık gülleri (1968) .... Necip
 Nilgün (1968)
 Mafya ölüm saçıyor (1968)
 Kanun namına (1968)
 İstanbul tatili (1968)
 İngiliz Kemal (1968) .... İngiliz Kemal
 Hırsız kız (1968)
 Funda (1968) .... Kenan
 Benim de kalbim var (1968)
 Bağdat hırsızı (1968)
 Aşka tövbe (1968) .... Mübin (a.k.a. Love No More)
 Sabahsız geceler (1968)
 Tarkan (1969) .... Tarkan
 Seninle düştüm dile (1969) .... Kenan
 Namus fedaisi (1969)
 Namluda üç kurşun (1969)
 Kötü kader (1969)
 Kızım ve Ben (1969)
 Deli Murat (1969) .... Murat
 Dağlar şahini (1969) .... Şahin
 Dağlar kızı Reyhan (1969) .... Kemal
 Cilveli kız (1969)
 Çakırcalı Mehmet Efe (1969) .... Çakırcalı Mehmet Efe
 Boş çerçeve (1969) .... Ferit

1970s

 Yumurcak (1970) .... Nihat
 Tarkan gümüş eyer (1970) .... Tarkan (a.k.a. Tarkan and the Silver Saddle)
 Son nefes (1970)
 Seven ne yapmaz (1970) .... Jön
 Sevenler ölmez (1970) .... Kemal
 Reyhan (1970) .... Kemal
 Küçük hanımefendi (1970)
 Kıskanırım seni (1970)
 Kadın satılmaz (1970)
 İşportacı kız (1970) .... Kartal
 Güller ve dikenler (1970)
 Fadime (1970)
 Beyaz güller (1970) (a.k.a. The White Roses)
 Aşk ve tabanca (1970)
 Arkadaşlık öldü mü? (1970)
 Tarkan Viking Kanı (1971) .... Tarkan (a.k.a. Tarkan and the Blood of the Vikings (Int), Tarkan versus the Vikings (USA: DVD))
 Tanrı şahidimdir (1971)
 Son hıçkırık (1971)
 Sevenler kavuşurmuş (1971) .... Kenan
 Senede bir gün (1971)
 Ölmeden tövbe et (1971)
 Mahşere kadar (1971) .... Murat
 Kaçak (1971) .... Doğan
 Görünce kurşunlarım (1971)
 Gelin çiçeği (1971)
 Beklenen şarkı (1971)
 Ateş parçası (1971)
 Aşkın kanunu (1971)
 Ömrümce unutamadım (1971)
 Zulüm (1972)
 Yalan dünya (1972)
 Vukuat var (1972) .... Muzaffer
 Tarkan: Altın madalyon (1972) .... Tarkan (a.k.a. Tarkan: The Gold Medallion)
 Karaoğlan geliyor (1972) .... Karaoğlan
 Aşk fırtınası (1972)
 Zambaklar açarken (1973)
 Tarkan güçlü kahraman (1973) .... Tarkan (a.k.a. Tarkan kolsuz kahramana karşı)
 Düşman (1973) .... Murat (a.k.a. The Enemy)
 Bir demet menekşe (1973) .... Kenan (a.k.a. A Bunch of Violets)

As director 

1970s

 Tosun Paşa (1976)
 Cennetin Çocukları (1977)
 Sultan (1978)
 Hababam Sınıfı Dokuz Doğuruyor (1978) (a.k.a. Crazy Class Hard Times)
 Şark Bülbülü (1979)

1980s

 Zübük (1980)
 Sevgi Dünyası (1980)
 Gol Kralı (1980)
 Mutlu Ol Yeter (1981)
 Gırgıriyede Şenlik Var (1981)
 Gırgıriye (1981)
 Davaro (1981)
 İffet (1982)
 Gözüm Gibi Sevdim (1982)
 Doktor Civanım (1982)
 Baş Belası (1982)
 Şalvar Davası (1983)
 En Büyük Şaban (1983)
 Çarıklı Milyoner (1983)
 Aile Kadını (1983)
 Şabaniye (1984)
 Bir sevgi istiyorum (1984)
 Sosyete Şaban (1985)
 Şendul Şaban (1985)
 Şaban Pabucu Yarım (1985)
 Keriz (1985)
 Gurbetçi Şaban (1985)
 Deli Deli Küpeli (1986)
 Japon İşi (1987)
 Aile Pansiyonu (1987)
 Sevimli Hırsız (1988)
 İnatçı (1988)
 Talih Kuşu (1989)
 Gülen Adam (1989)

1990s

 Koltuk Belası (1990)
 Kızlar Yurdu (1992) (mini) TV series
 Süper Baba (1993) TV series (1993–1994) (a.k.a. Superdad (USA))
 Bizim Aile (1995) (mini) TV series
 Ah Bir Zengin Olsam (1998) (mini) TV series

2000s (decade)

 Sih Senem (2003) (mini) TV series
 Ağa Kızı (2004) (mini) TV series
 Hababam Sınıfı Merhaba (2004) (a.k.a. The Class of Chaos)
 AB'nin Yolları Taştan (2005) (mini) TV series
 Emret Komutanim (2005) TV series
 Dünyayı Kurtaran Adam'ın Oğlu (2006) (a.k.a. Turks in Space)
 Amerikalılar Karadeniz'de 2 (2007) (a.k.a. American at the Black Sea)
 Zoraki Koca (2007) TV series

As writer 

 Çarıklı Milyoner (1983)
 Şabaniye (1984)
 Sosyete Şaban (1985)
 Şendul Şaban (1985)
 Deli Deli Küpeli (1986)
 Aile Pansiyonu (1987)

As editor 

 Dünyayı Kurtaran Adam'ın Oğlu (2006) (a.k.a. Turks in Space)

As producer 

 Şabaniye (1984)

References

External links 

 
 Biyografi.info – Biography of Kartal Tibet 
 Biyografi.net – Biography of Kartal Tibet 

1938 births
2021 deaths
Male actors from Ankara
TED Ankara College Foundation Schools alumni
Turkish male film actors
Golden Orange Life Achievement Award winners
20th-century Turkish male actors
Burials at Zincirlikuyu Cemetery